Operation Althea, formally the European Union Force Bosnia and Herzegovina (EUFOR), is a military deployment in Bosnia and Herzegovina to oversee the military implementation of the Dayton Agreement. It is the successor to NATO's SFOR and IFOR. The transition from SFOR to EUFOR was largely a change of name and commanders: 80% of the troops remained in place. It replaced SFOR on 2nd December 2004.

General Aspects
Civilian implementation of the Dayton Agreement is enforced by the Office of the High Representative.

EUFOR's commander is Major General Helmut Habermayer of Austria (all of EUFOR's commanders since 2009 have been Austrians). For this mission, the European Union Military Staff is using NATO's Supreme Headquarters Allied Powers Europe (SHAPE) as the EU's Operational Headquarters (OHQ) and is working through the Deputy to the Supreme Allied Commander Europe, a European officer.

EUFOR assumed all the missions of SFOR, except for the hunt for individuals indicted by the war crimes tribunal, notably Radovan Karadžić, former leader of Republika Srpska, and Ratko Mladić, their former military leader, which remained a mission for NATO through NATO Headquarters Sarajevo. EUFOR does have police duties against organised crime, which is believed to be linked to suspected war criminals. It worked with the European Union Police Mission in Bosnia and Herzegovina (EUPM) and with the Bosnian Police. The European Union Special Representative in Bosnia and Herzegovina provides political guidance on military issues with a local political dimension to the EUFOR.

, the total force of EUFOR is approximately 1,000 troops from 21 countries, including EU member states and non-EU "Troop Contributing Countries" (TCC) are present within EUFOR (Albania, Austria, Bulgaria, Chile, Czech Republic, France, Germany, Greece, Hungary, Ireland, Italy, Netherland, Poland, Portugal, North Macedonia, Romania, Slovakia, Slovenia, Spain, Switzerland and Turkey).

On 18th December 2020, the United Kingdom marked the end of its 16 year contribution to EUFOR, following Brexit.

As of early 2021, EUFOR personnel bases include:  
 Multinational Battalion is EUFOR's military maneuver unit for BiH, located at Camp Butmir, Sarajevo and comprises troops from Austria, Bulgaria, Hungary, Romania and Turkey.
 19 LOT Houses located throughout BiH to connect EUFOR to local communities and authorities.  From north to south, west to east – Cazin, Banja Luka (Romania) and Banja Luka (Chile), Brcko, Doboj, Tuzla, Zavidovici, Travnik, Bratunac, Zenica, Vlasenica, Sarajevo, Livno, Jablanica, Visegrad, Foca, Mostar Čapljina and Trebinje.

Commanders

See also

Military of the European Union
European Union rapid reaction mechanism
Common Security and Defence Policy
European Union Military Operation in the Former Yugoslav Republic of Macedonia

References

Further reading
Le Monde (in French)
http://eeas.europa.eu/archives/csdp/missions-and-operations/althea-bih/pdf/factsheet_eufor_althea_en.pdf
 Dominik Tolksdorf The Difficulties of the European Union in Supporting the Europeanization of Bosnia and Herzegovina EU Frontier Policy Paper, Budapest: Center for EU Enlargement Studies – Central European University, 2011

External links

Official EUFOR website
The Council of the European Union's page on EUFOR-Althea 
The European Union Special Representative (EUSR) for Bosnia and Herzegovina
the European Commission's Delegation to Bosnia & Herzegovina
Swiss Military Department EUFOR page (in French)

International law enforcement organizations
Law enforcement in Bosnia and Herzegovina
Althea
Bosnia and Herzegovina–European Union relations